Bernard Abert Byrne (October 19, 1853 – February 28, 1910) was a United States Army captain who received the Medal of Honor for actions during the Philippine–American War. He later achieved the rank of lieutenant colonel.

Early career
Byrne was born in Newport Barracks, Kentucky, in 1853. His father was Dr. Bernard Miles Byrne, a U.S. Army surgeon. His mother was Louisa Matlack (Abert) Byrne, the daughter of Colonel John James Abert, the first chief of the U.S. Topographical Service.

Byrne joined the army in Washington, D.C. He was educated at Colombian University (later George Washington University). He married Bertha Barnitz, daughter of Albert Trorillo Siders Barnitz, an officer twice brevetted for bravery.

Byrne was a member of the Sons of the American Revolution.

He was buried at Arlington National Cemetery.

Service history
 Appointed from Washington D.C., second lieutenant, 6th United States Infantry – October 15, 1875
 Appointed first lieutenant – December 31, 1882
 Regimental adjutant November 1, 1886 to March 31, 1890
 Appointed captain – November 9, 1894
 Earned Medal of Honor – July 19, 1899
 Appointed lieutenant colonel, 40th US Volunteer Infantry – August 17, 1899
 Honorably mustered out of volunteer service – June 24, 1901
 Appointed major, 13th United States Infantry – February 28, 1901
 Medal of Honor awarded – July 15, 1902
 Retired – July 13, 1906

Awards
Medal of Honor
Indian Campaign Medal
Spanish Campaign Medal
Army of Cuban Occupation Medal
Philippine Campaign Medal

Medal of Honor citation
Rank and Organization: Captain, 6th U.S. Infantry. Place and Date: At Bobong, Negros, Philippine Islands, July 19, 1899. Entered Service At: Washington, D.C. Birth: Newport Barracks, Va. Date of Issue: July 15, 1902.

Citation
Most distinguished gallantry in rallying his men on the bridge after the line had been broken and pushed back.

See also

List of Medal of Honor recipients
List of Philippine–American War Medal of Honor recipients

References

External links
 

United States Army Medal of Honor recipients
1853 births
1910 deaths
American military personnel of the Philippine–American War
Philippine–American War recipients of the Medal of Honor
Burials at Arlington National Cemetery
Military personnel from Kentucky